Lewis Morrison (September 4, 1844 – August 18, 1906) was a Jamaican-born American stage actor and theatrical manager, born Moritz (or Morris) W. Morris. He was best known for his portrayal of Mephistopheles in his own production of Faust, which he performed from 1885 to 1906. He was the father of actress Adrienne Morrison, and grandfather of Constance, Barbara and Joan Bennett.

Biography

Born Morris W. Morris, after the Civil War he became a stage actor using the name Lewis Morrison. He first performed in New Orleans beginning in minor roles with Edwin Booth and Charlotte Cushman until he was featured in larger parts. He became a well-known actor in New Orleans and moved on to the stage in New York, where he gained greater fame in Faust. He founded his own traveling theater troupe and traveled the world playing the role of Mephistopheles.

Personal life
Morrison was married first to Anglo-American actress Rose Wood. He was the father of actresses Rosabel Morrison and Adrienne Morrison; grandfather of actresses Constance, Barbara and Joan Bennett; and great-grandfather of television talk show host Morton Downey Jr.

Morrison and Rose Wood were divorced in 1890. He married the much younger stage actress Florence Roberts in 1892.

References

Sources

External links

portrait gallery (NY Public library, Billy Rose collection)

1844 births
1906 deaths
Emigrants from British Jamaica to the United States
19th-century American male actors
American male stage actors
People of Louisiana in the American Civil War
Jewish Confederates